Westminster is a London Underground station in the City of Westminster. It is served by the Circle, District and Jubilee lines. On the Circle and District lines, the station is between St James's Park and Embankment, and on the Jubilee line it is between Green Park and Waterloo. It is in Travelcard Zone 1. The station is located at the corner of Bridge Street and Victoria Embankment and is close to the Houses of Parliament, Westminster Abbey, Parliament Square, Whitehall, Westminster Bridge, and the London Eye. Also close by are Downing Street, the Cenotaph, Westminster Millennium Pier, the Treasury, the Foreign and Commonwealth Office, and the Supreme Court.

The station is in two parts: sub-surface platforms opened in 1868 by the District Railway (DR) as part of the company's first section of the Inner Circle route and deep level platforms opened in 1999 as part of the Jubilee line extension from Green Park to Stratford. A variety of underground and main line services have operated over the sub-surface tracks, but the original station was completely rebuilt in conjunction with the construction of the deep level platforms and Portcullis House, which sits above the station.

History

Circle & District line platforms

The station was opened as Westminster Bridge on 24 December 1868 by the steam-operated District Railway (DR) (now the District line) when the railway opened the first section of its line from South Kensington. It was originally the eastern terminus of the DR and the station cutting ended at a concrete wall buffered by timber sleepers. The approach to the station from the west runs in cut and cover tunnel under the roadway of Broad Sanctuary and diagonally under Parliament Square. In Broad Sanctuary the tunnel is close to Westminster Abbey and St Margaret's church and care was required to avoid undermining their foundations when excavating in the poor ground found there.

The original station building was a temporary structure positioned over the tracks and the platforms were sheltered with individual awnings rather than the all-over glazed roof provided at the DR's other stations. Access to the station was via a passageway from Bridge Street and a pedestrian subway under the road. On 30 May 1870, the railway was extended to Blackfriars.

The DR connected to the Metropolitan Railway (MR, later the Metropolitan line) at South Kensington and, although the two companies were rivals, each company operated its trains over the other's tracks in a joint service known as the Inner Circle. On 1 February 1872, the DR opened a northbound branch from its station at Earl's Court to connect to the West London Extension Joint Railway (WLEJR, now the West London Line) at Addison Road (now Kensington (Olympia)). From that date the Outer Circle service began running over the DR's tracks. The service was run by the North London Railway (NLR) from its terminus at Broad Street (now demolished) in the City of London via the North London Line to Willesden Junction, then the West London Line to Addison Road and the DR to Mansion House – at that time the eastern terminus of the DR.

From 1 August 1872, the Middle Circle service also began operations through South Kensington, running from Moorgate along the MR's tracks on the north side of the Inner Circle to Paddington, then over the Hammersmith & City Railway (H&CR) track to Latimer Road, then, via a now demolished link, on the WLEJR to Addison Road and the DR to Mansion House. The service was operated jointly by the H&CR and the DR. On 30 June 1900, the Middle Circle service was shortened to terminate at Earl's Court, and, on 31 December 1908, the Outer Circle service was withdrawn from the DR tracks. As part of efforts to improve competitiveness, the DR's tracks were electrified during 1905 and new electric rolling stock was brought into use. In 1907, the station was given its present name, Westminster.

By the mid-1890s the station entrance had been incorporated into a larger building. In 1922, a new entrance and canopy was designed for the Bridge Street entrance by Charles Holden and, in 1924, he designed a plainly rendered replacement elevation for the eastern entrance on to the Embankment. These were the first of many projects by the architect for the London Electric Railway (the main forerunner of London Transport and Transport for London). The station platforms were also refurbished with new wall tiling in the green, blue, black and white tiling scheme used later by Holden on many stations of the period and still visible at neighbouring St James's Park station. In 1949, the Metropolitan line-operated Inner Circle route was given its own identity on the tube map as the Circle line.

Between late 1962 and early 1964 the east ends of the platforms were extended to allow longer 8-car trains to be operated. This involved carefully enlarging the tunnels under the Metropolitan Police's original headquarters at New Scotland Yard (now Norman Shaw Buildings). The station was completely rebuilt to incorporate new deep-level platforms for the Jubilee line when it was extended to the London Docklands in the 1990s. During the works, the level of the sub-surface platforms was lowered to enable ground level access to Portcullis House. This was achieved in small increments which were carried out when the line was closed at night.

Jubilee line platforms

When the first section of the Jubilee line was planned in the 1970s, the second phase of the project was intended to continue the line eastwards from the terminus at Charing Cross to the City of London, Woolwich and Thamesmead. Westminster station would not have been on this planned route, but the need to provide transport infrastructure for the redevelopment of the London Docklands in east and south-east London led to a redirection of the route to run via Westminster to connect Waterloo and London Bridge stations with the new developments. For the Jubilee Line Extension, the buildings around the station were demolished and the sub-surface station was completely reconstructed together with the erection of a parliamentary office building, Portcullis House, which sits above the station. Both projects were designed by Michael Hopkins & Partners.

The void, known as the station box, was the deepest ever excavation in central London and was carried out between thick reinforced concrete diaphragm walls stiffened and braced horizontally for stability. Under Bridge Street, on the south side of the station box, the two Jubilee line platform tunnels are arranged with the westbound platform below the eastbound. The depth of the station box excavation and the proximity of the tunnels represented a significant risk to the stability of the foundation of the Houses of Parliament's clock tower (commonly known as Big Ben), which stands only  from the edge of the station box. The tubes were provided with a control system through which grout was injected into the ground to compensate for settlement detected from detailed measurements of the clock tower's position. As excavation of the station box and the tunnels took place, grout was injected on 22 occasions between January 1996 and September 1997. Without the grout injection, the movement would have been at least  causing cracking to the structure of the tower and the Houses of Parliament. The Jubilee line platforms were opened on 22 December 1999, although trains had been running through the station without stopping since 20 November 1999.

The station's architecture is an austere combination of concrete and stainless steel, with stacked banks of escalators supported from the cross-bracing structures spanning the station box and routes for passengers entering or leaving the station separated from those changing between lines. As with the other underground stations on the extension, the Jubilee line platforms feature platform edge doors to improve airflow through the system and increase safety. The station design won a number of awards including Civic Trust awards in 2000 and 2002, the Royal Fine Art Commission Millennium Building of the Year award in 2000 and the RIBA Award for Architecture in 2001. Both projects were jointly short-listed in 2001 for the RIBA's prestigious Stirling Prize.

Design icon

As part of the Transported by Design programme of activities, on 15 October 2015, after two months of public voting, Westminster tube station was elected by Londoners as one of the 10 favourite transport design icons.

Services
The station is in London fare zone 1. On the District and Circle lines, the station is between St James's Park and Embankment, and, on the Jubilee line, it is between Green Park and Waterloo. Train frequencies vary throughout the day, but generally District line trains operate every 2–6 minutes from approximately 05:25 to 00:38 eastbound and 05:49 to 00:37 westbound; they are supplemented by Circle line trains every 8–12 minutes from approximately 05:49 to 00:24 clockwise and 05:36 to 00:19 anticlockwise. Jubilee line trains operate every 2–5 minutes from approximately 05:28 to 00:48 eastbound and 05:38 to 00:31 northbound.

Connections
London Buses routes 3, 11, 12, 24, 87, 88, 148, 159, 211, 453 and night routes N3, N11, N44, N53, N87, N109, N136, N155 and N381 serve the station.

Notes and references

Notes

References

Bibliography

External links 

 London Transport Museum Photographic Archive
 
 
 
 
 More photographs of Westminster station
 Westminster station page

Circle line (London Underground) stations
District line stations
Jubilee line stations
London Underground Night Tube stations
Tube stations in the City of Westminster
Former Metropolitan District Railway stations
Railway stations in Great Britain opened in 1868
Railway stations by Hopkins Architects